The Boston Opera Company (BOC) was an American opera company located in Boston, Massachusetts, that was active from 1909 to 1915.

History
The company was founded in 1908 by Bostonian millionaire Eben Dyer Jordan, Jr. and impresario Henry Russell. Jordan, an opera enthusiast and amateur singer, was the heir to a department store fortune and provided the company's financial backing for its first three seasons. He also provided the funds necessary to complete the Boston Opera House, as the theatre's construction had been halted for some years due to lack of finances.

Russell had worked as a talent manager and opera director in Europe and from 1906 until 1909 his touring opera company, the San Carlo Opera Company (SCOC), had been based in Boston when not on the road. The SCOC was basically the artistic seed for the new Boston Opera Company as many artists working for this touring company, such as Alice Nielsen, Lillian Nordica, Florencio Constantino, and Louise Homer, became a part of the Boston Opera Company. The company's first performance was given for the opening of the Boston Opera House on November 8, 1909. The company presented Amilcare Ponchielli's "La Gioconda" with Nordica in the title role and Homer as La Cieca.

During its six seasons the BOC presented a wide array of works, including two contemporary operas by Boston composer Frederick Converse: The Pipe of Desire and The Sacrifice. Although the company was admired for its artistic excellence (largely due to the fine conducting by Felix Weingartner), the organization was plagued with financial worries after the initial backing by Jordan ended. These monetary problems eventually forced the company to declare bankruptcy on May 11, 1915.

Notable singers

Elizabeth Amsden
Georges Baklanoff
Marguerite Bériza
Eugenia Bronskaya
Edmond Clément
Florencio Constantino
Diamond Donner
Edoardo Ferrari-Fontana
Mary Garden
Maria Gay
Louise Homer
Georgette Leblanc
Lydia Lipkowska
Pavel Ludikar
Vanni Marcoux
Edith Mason
Nellie Melba
Carmen Melis
Tamaki Miura
Jane Morgan
Lucien Muratore
Marguerite Namara
Alice Nielsen
Lillian Nordica
Evelyn Parnell
Antonio Pini-Corsi
Giovanni Polese
Evelyn Scotney
Myrna Sharlow
Marguerite Sylva
Luisa Tetrazzini
Maggie Teyte
Giovanni Zenatello

References

External links
 

Opera companies in Boston
Musical groups established in 1908
Musical groups disestablished in 1915
20th century in Boston
1908 establishments in Massachusetts
1915 disestablishments in Massachusetts